State Jewish Theater may refer to:

 State Jewish Theater (Romania)
 Moscow State Jewish Theater